Howard Malcolm Baldrige or H. Malcolm Baldrige (June 23, 1894 – January 19, 1985) was a Republican politician from Nebraska.

Biography

Early life and ancestors
Baldrige was born on June 23, 1894 in Omaha, Nebraska, the son of Nebraska state senator Howard Hammond Baldrige (1864–1928) and Letitia Blanche Coffey.

Education
Baldrige graduated from Omaha High School in 1912. He attended Phillips Academy in Andover, Massachusetts, in 1914 and he graduated in 1918 from Yale University in New Haven, Connecticut where he was a member of Skull and Bones and captain of the wrestling team. He was also a member of Psi Upsilon and was a letterman in football at Yale.

In World War I, he served as captain of Battery F, Three Hundred and Thirty-eighth Field Artillery for the United States. In 1921, he graduated from University of Nebraska–Lincoln College of Law and was admitted to the bar, setting up practice in Omaha.

Marriage and family
On November 30, 1921, he was married to Regina Katherine Connell at Omaha. She was born at Omaha, Douglas County, Nebraska on September 23, 1896, the daughter of Dr. Ralph Wardlaw Connell and Katherine E Walsh. She was a 1921 graduate of Wellesley College. Her uncle, William James Connell, was a Nebraska Republican politician and served as a member of the United States House of Representatives for Nebraska's 1st congressional district. Her first cousin, Dr. Karl Albert Connell, invented the gas mask used by American troops during World War I.

They were the parents of three children, Howard Malcolm Baldrige, Jr., born October 4, 1922; Robert Connell Baldrige, born November 9, 1924, and Letitia Baldrige, born February 9, 1926.

Political career
He served in the Nebraska state house of representatives in 1923 and was a delegate to the 1924 Republican National Convention and the 1928 Republican National Convention. He was elected to the Seventy-second United States Congress as a representative for the second district and served from March 4, 1931, to March 3, 1933. He was an unsuccessful candidate for reelection in 1932.

Post political career
Afterwards, he resumed the practice of law. During the Second World War, he entered the Army on June 10, 1942, and became a major in the United States Army Air Corps. He was discharged as a colonel on October 25, 1945, resuming law practice with offices in New York City and Washington, D.C. He was a resident of Washington, Connecticut, until his death. He died on January 19, 1985, in Southbury, Connecticut. He is buried at Forest Lawn Cemetery in Omaha.

Notes

References
 Cleave, Egbert. Cleave's biographical cyclopaedia of homoeopathic physicians and surgeons. Philadelphia: Galaxy publishing company, 1873.
 King, William Harvey. History of homoeopathy and its institutions in America; their founders, benefactors, faculties, officers, hospitals, alumni, etc., with a record of achievement of its representatives in the world of medicine. New York, Chicago, The Lewis publishing company, 1905.
 Welch, M.J. Douglas County Who's Who in Nebraska, 1940 Published by; Nebraska Press Association - Lincoln, 1940

External links
 

1894 births
1985 deaths
20th-century American lawyers
20th-century American politicians
Creighton Bluejays football coaches
Members of the Nebraska House of Representatives
Connecticut Republicans
Nebraska lawyers
Republican Party members of the United States House of Representatives from Nebraska
United States Army personnel of World War I
United States Army Air Forces personnel of World War II
United States Army officers
United States Army Air Forces officers
Yale Bulldogs football players
Phillips Academy alumni
Politicians from Omaha, Nebraska
Sportspeople from Omaha, Nebraska
Players of American football from Nebraska
Coaches of American football from Nebraska
Military personnel from Nebraska